Sky Cinema is a German set of movie channels owned by Sky Deutschland.

The Sky Cinema package includes eleven Sky-branded channels:
Sky Cinema Premieren, the premium channel with 20 television premieres per month.
Sky Cinema Premieren +24, Sky Cinema Premieren with an hour delay.
Sky Cinema +24, Sky Cinema with 1 day delay.
Sky Cinema Action with action, horror and sci-fi movies.
Sky Cinema Fun with various kinds of comedy and family movies.
Sky Cinema Emotion with love stories, romantic comedies and dramas.
Sky Cinema Nostalgie with classic movies from the 1930s to the 1970s.
Sky Cinema Special used for a pop up channel for an event
Sky Cinema Classics with classic movies until present days.
Sky Cinema HD, Sky Cinema +1 HD, Sky Cinema +24 HD, Sky Cinema Hits HD and Sky Cinema Action HD with movies in high-definition.
Movies are broadcast in the 16:9 widescreen format with both German and original audio, when available.
In order to watch movies in high-definition, you also have to pay for Sky HD, another set of programs. By booking this set, the channels fitting into the other booked sets, such as Sky Sport are decrypted as well.

History

Origins
The different channels in the package mostly have their origins in the analogue Premiere channel which started broadcasting in 1991 and the movie channels of the DF1 platform started in 1996. The movie package on the DF1 platform consisted of Cine Action, Cine Comedy, Romantic Movies, Star*Kino and Western Movies.

When DF1 and Premiere merged to form the platform "Premiere World" in October 1999, it movie package, which was called "Movie World", consisted of the Premiere channel and 13th Street as well as the former DF1 channels Star*Kino, Cine Action, Cine Comedy, Sci Fantasy and Romantic Movies while  Western Movies closed.

This structure remained until July 2001 when Premiere World relaunched their packages and brought all the channels they owned under the Premiere umbrella brand.
Premiere was extended to three channels: Premiere 1, Premiere 2 and Premiere 3
Star*Kino renamed Premiere Star
Cine Comedy renamed Premiere Comedy
Sci Fantasy renamed Premiere Sci-fi
Cine Action renamed Premiere Action
Romantic Movies was closed down and replaced with Premiere Action-X, a sister channel of Premiere Action

In May 2002, "Premiere World" became simply "Premiere". At the same time, the themed movie channel were replaced by the numbered movie screens Premiere 4 through Premiere 7 while Premiere Action-X closed.

On 1 August 2006, the channels were overhauled again. Premiere 1 to Premiere 4 became part of a package called "Premiere Blockbuster", which also included Disney Channel. Premiere 5, Premiere 6 and Premiere 7 were closed down and replaced by Premiere Filmclassics and Premiere Filmfest. They became part of a package called "Premiere Entertainment", which also included Premiere Serie, Premiere Krimi and Premiere Nostalgie.

"Premiere Blockbuster" and "Premiere Entertainment" merged and became "Premiere Film" in on 1 July 2008.

2009 relaunch
On 4 July 2009, Premiere was relaunched and became Sky Deutschland. All Premiere channels were renamed. The movie channels got the following names:
Premiere 1 split into two channels: Sky Cinema and Sky Action
Premiere 2 became Sky Cinema +1
Premiere 3 became Sky Cinema +24
Premiere 4 became Sky Comedy
Premiere Filmclassics became Sky Cinema Hits, now "Sky Hits"
Premiere Filmfest became Sky Emotion
Premiere Nostalgie became Sky Nostalgie

The Premiere Film channels were sold with Disney Channel and Fox Channel. When Sky was relaunched, those two channels were moved to the Sky Welt package, while the MGM Channel and Disney Cinemagic took their place. Premiere Krimi was moved to the Sky Welt package and became Sky Krimi.

With the relaunch, the channels adopted the searchlights-themed graphics, used by the British Sky Movies channels since 2007, with the logos replaced by those of German counterparts. Sky Cinema uses Sky Movies Premiere's ident, while Sky Action uses Sky Movies Action & Thriller's, Sky Emotion uses Sky Movies Drama's, Sky Nostalgie uses Sky Movies Classics', Sky Comedy uses Sky Movies Indie's (not the Sky Movies Comedy's), and Sky Cinema Hits uses the original idents of Sky Movies HD 1 and 2.

When the channels where rebranded, there was only one high-definition simulcast channel, Sky Cinema HD. It was joined by two more HD simulcasts on 13 August 2010, Sky Cinema Hits HD and Sky Action HD.

2020 relaunch

On 11 March 2020, Sky Cinema was revamped with new and renamed channels:
 Sky Cinema and Sky Cinema +24 became Sky Cinema Premieren and Sky Cinema Premieren +24. Sky Cinema +1 will close. 
 Sky Cinema Comedy, Nostalgie, Emotion and Hits were replaced by Sky Cinema Family (SD/HD), Sky Cinema Best Of (SD/HD), Sky Cinema Special (HD), Sky Cinema Thriller (HD), Sky Cinema Fun (SD), and Sky Cinema Classics (SD)
 Sky Cinema Action continued to broadcast, in HD and SD as before.

References

External links
 

Sky Deutschland
Sky television channels
Television channels and stations established in 1991
Television stations in Germany
Television stations in Austria
German-language television stations
1991 establishments in Germany